Matthías Kristjánsson (July 14, 1924 – December 23, 1998) was an Icelandic cross-country skier who competed in the 1950s. He finished 33rd in the 50 km event at the 1952 Winter Olympics in Oslo.

External links
Olympic 50 km cross country skiing results: 1948-64
Matthías Kristjánsson's grave 

Matthias Kristjansson
Cross-country skiers at the 1952 Winter Olympics
Matthias Kristjansson
1924 births
1998 deaths
20th-century Icelandic people